İhsan Sabri Özün (born 23 June 1963) is a Turkish swimmer. He competed in four events at the 1984 Summer Olympics.

References

1963 births
Living people
Turkish male swimmers
Olympic swimmers of Turkey
Swimmers at the 1984 Summer Olympics
Place of birth missing (living people)
20th-century Turkish people